The American pickerels are two subspecies of Esox americanus, a medium-sized species of North American freshwater predatory fish belonging to the pike family (genus Esox in family Esocidae of order Esociformes):
 Redfin pickerel, sometimes called the brook pickerel, E. americanus americanus Gmelin, 1789;
 Grass pickerel, E. americanus vermiculatus Lesueur, 1846.

Lesueur originally classified the grass pickerel as E. vermiculatus, but it is now considered a subspecies of E. americanus.

There is no widely accepted English common collective name for the two E. americanus subspecies; "American pickerel" is a translation of the French systematic name brochet d'Amérique.

Description 
The two subspecies are very similar, but the grass pickerel lacks the redfin's distinctive orange to red fin coloration, as its fins having dark leading edges and amber to dusky coloration. In addition, the light areas between the dark bands are generally wider on the grass pickerel and narrower on the redfin pickerel. Redfin and grass pickerels are typically smaller than chain pickerels, which can be much larger.

Distribution and habitats 
The redfin and grass pickerels occur primarily in sluggish, vegetated waters of pools, lakes and wetlands, and are carnivorous predators feeding on smaller fish.  However, larger fishes, such as the striped bass (Morone saxatilis), bowfin (Amia calva) and gray weakfish (Cynoscion regalis), prey on the pickerels in turn when the latter venture into larger rivers or estuaries.

The pickerels reproduce by scattering spherical, sticky eggs in shallow, heavily vegetated waters. The eggs hatch in 11–15 days; the adult pickerels guard neither the eggs nor the young.

Both subspecies are native to the freshwater bodies of North America, and are not to be confused with their more aggressive big cousin, the northern pike. The redfin pickerel's range extends from the Saint Lawrence basin in Quebec down to the Gulf Coast, from Mississippi to Florida; while the grass pickerel's range is further west, extending from the Great Lakes Basin, from Ontario to Michigan, down to the western Gulf Coast, from eastern Texas to Mississippi.

Fishing 
The E. americanus subspecies are not as highly prized as a game fish as their larger cousins, the northern pike and muskellunge, but they are nevertheless caught by anglers. McClane's Standard Fishing Encyclopedia describes ultralight tackle as a sporty if overlooked method to catch these small but voracious pikes.

References

 
 
 
 Weinmand, M.L.; Lauer, T.E., "Diet of grass pickerel Esox americanus vermiculatus in Indiana streams." Journal of Freshwater Ecology 22-3 (2007): 451-460
 Midkiff, E.S.; Tarter, D.C., "Diet and growth of larval and juvenile grass pickerel Esox americanus vermiculatus, and central mudminnow, Umbra limi, in the Green Bottom Wildlife Management Area, Cabell County West Virginia." Proceedings of the West Virginia Academy of Science 68- 2-4 (1996): 37-46
 Weed, A.C., "Pike, pickerel and muskalonge." Field Mus Nat Hist Zool Leaflet 9 (1927): 1-52
 Cain, M.L.; Lauer, T.E.; Lau, J.K., "Habitat use of grass pickerel Esox americanus vermiculatus in Indiana streams." American Midland Naturalists 160-1 (2008):96-109
 Lachance, S., "Report on the situation of the Redfin Pickerel, Esox americanus americanus, in Canada." Canadian Field-Naturalist 115-4 (2001): 597-607

External links

American pickerel
Fish of the Eastern United States
Fish of the Great Lakes
American pickerel
American pickerel